Gustav Denk (24 January 1915 – 13 February 1943) was a German Luftwaffe ace and recipient of the Knight's Cross of the Iron Cross during World War II. Denk claimed 67 aerial victories, two over the Western Front and 65 over the Eastern Front.

Career
Denk was born on 24 January 1915 in Soest in the Province of Westphalia of the German Empire. He joined the Luftwaffe at the beginning of the war and participated in the Invasion of Poland and the Battle of France, but did not claim his first victory until the Battle of Britain.

Operation Barbarossa
In preparation of Operation Barbarossa, the German invasion of the Soviet Union, II. Gruppe of JG 52, without a period of replenishment in Germany, was ordered to airfields close to the German-Soviet demarcation line. While the Gruppenstab (group headquarters unit) and 4. Staffel were based at Suwałki in northeastern Poland, 5. and 6. Staffel were transferred to a forward airfield at Sobolewo. For the invasion, II. Gruppe of JG 52 was subordinated to the Geschwaderstab (headquarters unit) of Jagdgeschwader 27 (JG 27—27th Fighter Wing). The Geschwader was part of the VIII. Fliegerkorps commanded by Generaloberst Wolfram Freiherr von Richthofen which supported the northern wing of Army Group Centre.

Squadron leader and death
In January 1943, Denk officially succeeded Oberleutnant Siegfried Simsch as Staffelkapitän (squadron leader) of 5. Staffel of JG 52. Simsch had been wounded in combat on 3 November 1942. The Staffel had then been temporarily led by Oberfeldwebel Willi Nemitz. On 10 February, he succeeded Hauptmann Rudolf Resch as Staffelkapitän of 6. Staffel of JG 52.

Denk was killed in action on 13 February 1943 when he was shot down in his Messerschmitt Bf 109 G-2 (Werknummer 14554—factory number) by anti-aircraft artillery over the Soviet airfield at Chernigov. He was posthumously awarded the Knight's Cross of the Iron Cross on 14 March 1943. Denk was succeeded by Nemitz as commander of 6. Staffel.

Summary of career

Aerial victory claims
According to US historian David T. Zabecki, Denk was credited with 67 aerial victories. Spick also lists Denk with 67 aerial victories claimed in over 500 combat missions. Mathews and Foreman, authors of Luftwaffe Aces — Biographies and Victory Claims, researched the German Federal Archives and found records for 67 aerial victory claims, plus one further unconfirmed claim. All but two of his confirmed victories were claimed on the Eastern Front.

Victory claims were logged to a map-reference (PQ = Planquadrat), for example "PQ 95722". These sectors were then subdivided into 36 smaller units to give a location area 3 × 4 km in size.

Awards
 Front Flying Clasp of the Luftwaffe
 Iron Cross (1939) 2nd and 1st Class
 Honour Goblet of the Luftwaffe on 2 November 1942 as Leutnant and pilot
 German Cross in Gold on 23 December 1942 as Leutnant in the II./Jagdgeschwader 52
 Knight's Cross of the Iron Cross on 14 March 1943 as Oberleutnant and pilot in the II./Jagdgeschwader 52

Notes

References

Citations

Bibliography

 
 
 
 
 
 
 
 
 
 
 
 
 
 
 
 

1915 births
1943 deaths
People from Soest, Germany
Luftwaffe pilots
German World War II flying aces
Recipients of the Gold German Cross
Recipients of the Knight's Cross of the Iron Cross
Luftwaffe personnel killed in World War II
Aviators killed by being shot down
Military personnel from North Rhine-Westphalia